The Port of Anping is located in Tainan in South District and Anping District.

In the early 20th century, the main port's entrance was located near the northern part of Yuguang Borough. However, this shallow entrance was only accessible to pleasure craft and fishing vessels. In the 1970s, a channel deep enough to accommodate 6,000-tonne cargo ships was dug, separating Yugang Borough from the main island of Taiwan, after which the locality became unofficially known as Yuguang Island. The port was designated an international commercial port in 1997.

References

1979 establishments in Taiwan
Anping
Buildings and structures in Tainan
Ports and harbors of Taiwan